Sara G. Innamorato is an American politician who was elected to the Pennsylvania House of Representatives in 2018 and is the Representative for the 21st district, which includes parts of Pittsburgh and the surrounding area.

Early life and education
Innamorato was raised in Ross Township and attended the North Hills School District. She graduated magna cum laude from the University of Pittsburgh with a B.S. in business.

Early career
She started Innamo Co., an independent marketing firm focused on "social good". Innamorato is a co-founder of She Runs SWPA, a non-partisan organization focused on encouraging women to run for office.

Political career

Elections
2018
A member of the Democratic Socialists of America (DSA), she won the Democratic Party nomination for the seat by defeating incumbent Dom Costa in the 2018 primary election with over 64% of the vote.

Innamorato was unopposed on the ballot for the general election. Costa launched a write-in campaign late in the election cycle. Costa went public with the bid following a podcast interview in which Innamorato was quoted saying "My district, which I know is like white working class, poor folk, who are racist, because it's so much easier for them to look to their side and say, 'I'm going to blame that person. Costa campaign head Gary Britcher argued that Innamorato had called the district "racist". Another interview quoted Innamorato in stating that the comment had been taken out of context and the Costa campaign's portrayal was "'not how I feel. From the beginning of this campaign, I've talked about my experience growing up in that district, and about the kindness of neighborhood (sic) who helped me through the instability of growing up.' Her point, she said, was that white working class voters 'are being exploited from all sides,' by economic and political elites who play on racial tensions to distract them from issues of economic injustice. 'Racism exists everywhere,' she said. 'My job is to represent everyone, and to not shy away from tough conversations.

Innamorato received 85% of the vote in the general election.

After the election, allegations surfaced that two violations of Pennsylvania campaign finance law were committed by the PAC "Americans Against Socialism," the principle funding mechanism for the marketing firm employed by the Costa write-in campaign.

2020
Innamorato was initially challenged by Stephen Zappala III for the Democratic Party nomination. Zappala is the son of the Allegheny County District Attorney. Zappala quietly withdrew his challenge the following month. Innamorato was unopposed on the ballot for the Democratic Party nomination.

Innamorato defeated Republican challenger John Waugh in the general election.

Committee assignments 

 Finance
 Labor & Industry
 Transportation
 Urban Affairs

Political positions

Electoral reform
Innamorato is the prime sponsor of HB 1556, a bill designed to expand automatic voter registration services to all individuals who utilize state government and legislative services. The bill was designed as part of a suite of electoral reform bills advanced by the House Democratic Caucus.

Environment
Innamorato is opposed to hydraulic fracturing, citing a number of public health concerns in communities near drilling sites and refineries. She has voted against legislation to grant tax exemptions and incentives to new petrochemical plants, labeling such proposals "corporate welfare". However, Innamorato has also organized public hearings to encourage dialogue between labor unions and anti-fracking organizations, saying she believes the choice between "the environment" and "good union jobs, family sustaining jobs" is "false and ... antiquated." Innamorato has stated that she has worked to draft legislation to prevent the dumping of chemicals and waste water used in hydraulic fracturing into sewage treatments plants and public waterways, due to alleged radioactive contamination.

Innamorato has spoken in favor of Green New Deal legislation, as well as green and sustainable infrastructure development.

Housing
Innamorato has spoken in favor of Inclusionary Zoning and Affordable Housing initiatives. During the COVID-19 pandemic, Innamorato joined with other lawmakers in calling for a moratorium on evictions. She was the author of legislation that called for statewide rent and mortgage freezes for the duration of the COVID-19 response and economic recovery.

Public health
Innamorato has spoken publicly in favor of instituting a Medicare-for-All type universal health insurance program for Pennsylvania.

She is the author of legislation creating a free and universal "Baby Box" program, for expectant mothers in Pennsylvania. The program aims to reduce infant mortality, and provide basic maternity and childcare items.

Innamorato sponsored legislation with the aim to end the practice that allowed medical students in Pennsylvania to perform pelvic examinations on unconscious women without their prior consent.

Innamorato has spoken publicly about struggles with opioid abuse and death from overdose within her own family. She favors what she terms "harm reduction strategies" to combat the epidemic; including policies such as decriminalization and rehabilitation for drug users.

Public transit 
Innamorato supports the improvement and expansion of public transportation and transit access in her district. She has stated also that she thinks Pennsylvania should "focus on systems that are publicly held that are going to move the most people in the most efficient way possible."

She supported legislation to change Pennsylvania code, allowing for Parking Protected bike lanes.

Social services
Innamorato supports increasing funding and the availability of social services and programs in Pennsylvania. She provided testimony at a public hearing, in opposition to legislation that would end the Pennsylvania General Assistance Program.

Taxation 
Innamorato is an advocate for a policy called the "Fair Share Tax Plan". The proposal advocates for a number of policy initiatives to restructure Pennsylvania's tax system.

Innamorato supported legislation giving Second Class cities in Pennsylvania the legal authority to freeze property taxes for long time, and elderly residents.

2020 presidential election
Innamorato publicly endorsed Bernie Sanders for the 2020 Democratic Party Presidential nomination.

Following the suspension of the Sanders campaign, Innamorato signed on to a joint statement calling on Joe Biden to embrace parts of Sanders' campaign platform. Innamorato expressed concerns about Biden's conduct following allegations against him of sexual assault.

See also
List of Democratic Socialists of America who have held office in the United States

References

External links
Sara Innamorato for State Rep Campaign website
Representative Sara Innamorato profile

Living people
Pennsylvania Democrats
Democratic Socialists of America politicians from Pennsylvania
American people of Italian descent
21st-century American politicians
21st-century American women politicians
University of Pittsburgh alumni
Pennsylvania socialists
1986 births